In mathematics, a complete lattice is a partially ordered set in which all subsets have both a supremum (join) and an infimum (meet). A lattice which satisfies at least one of these properties is known as a conditionally complete lattice. Specifically, every non-empty finite lattice is complete. Complete lattices appear in many applications in mathematics and computer science. Being a special instance of lattices, they are studied both in order theory and universal algebra.

Complete lattices must not be confused with complete partial orders (cpos), which constitute a strictly more general class of partially ordered sets. More specific complete lattices are complete Boolean algebras and complete Heyting algebras (locales).

Formal definition 
A partially ordered set (L, ≤) is a complete lattice if every subset A of L has both a greatest lower bound (the infimum, also called the meet) and a least upper bound (the supremum, also called the join) in (L, ≤).

In the special case where A is the empty set, the meet of A will be the greatest element of L. Likewise, the join of the empty set yields the least element. Since the definition also assures the existence of binary meets and joins, complete lattices thus form a special class of bounded lattices.

More implications of the above definition are discussed in the article on completeness properties in order theory.

Complete semilattices 
In order theory, arbitrary meets can be expressed in terms of arbitrary joins and vice versa (for details, see completeness (order theory)). In effect, this means that it is sufficient to require the existence of either all meets or all joins to obtain the class of all complete lattices.

As a consequence, some authors use the terms complete meet-semilattice or complete join-semilattice as another way to refer to complete lattices. Though similar on objects, the terms entail different notions of homomorphism, as will be explained in the below section on morphisms.

On the other hand, some authors have no use for this distinction of morphisms (especially since the emerging concepts of "complete semilattice morphisms" can as well be specified in general terms). Consequently, complete meet-semilattices have also been defined as those meet-semilattices that are also complete partial orders. This concept is arguably the "most complete" notion of a meet-semilattice that is not yet a lattice (in fact, only the top element may be missing). This discussion is also found in the article on semilattices.

Complete sublattices 

If the above requirement is lessened to require only non-empty meet and joins to be in L, the sublattice M is called a closed sublattice of M.

Conditionally Complete Lattices
A lattice is said to be "conditionally complete" if it satisfies either or both of the following properties:

 Any subset bounded above has a least upper bound
 Any subset bounded below has a greatest lower bound

Examples 
 Any non-empty finite lattice is trivially complete.
 The power set of a given set, ordered by inclusion. The supremum is given by the union and the infimum by the intersection of subsets.
 The unit interval [0,1] and the extended real number line, with the familiar total order and the ordinary suprema and infima.  Indeed, a totally ordered set (with its order topology) is compact as a topological space if it is complete as a lattice.
 The non-negative integers, ordered by divisibility. The least element of this lattice is the number 1, since it divides any other number. Perhaps surprisingly, the greatest element is 0, because it can be divided by any other number. The supremum of finite sets is given by the least common multiple and the infimum by the greatest common divisor. For infinite sets, the supremum will always be 0 while the infimum can well be greater than 1. For example, the set of all even numbers has 2 as the greatest common divisor.  If 0 is removed from this structure it remains a lattice but ceases to be complete.
 The subgroups of any given group under inclusion. (While the infimum here is the usual set-theoretic intersection, the supremum of a set of subgroups is the subgroup generated by the set-theoretic union of the subgroups, not the set-theoretic union itself.) If e is the identity of G, then the trivial group {e} is the minimum subgroup of G, while the maximum subgroup is the group G itself.
 The submodules of a module, ordered by inclusion. The supremum is given by the sum of submodules and the infimum by the intersection.
 The ideals of a ring, ordered by inclusion. The supremum is given by the sum of ideals and the infimum by the intersection.
 The open sets of a topological space, ordered by inclusion. The supremum is given by the union of open sets and the infimum by the interior of the intersection.
 The convex subsets of a real or complex vector space, ordered by inclusion. The infimum is given by the intersection of convex sets and the supremum by the convex hull of the union.
 The topologies on a set, ordered by inclusion. The infimum is given by the intersection of topologies, and the supremum by the topology generated by the union of topologies.
 The lattice of all transitive relations on a set.
 The lattice of all sub-multisets of a multiset.
 The lattice of all equivalence relations on a set; the equivalence relation ~ is considered to be smaller (or "finer") than ≈ if x~y always implies x≈y.
 The lattice of self-adjoint projections (also known as orthogonal projections) of a von Neumann algebra.

Locally finite complete lattices
A complete lattice L is said to be locally finite if the supremum of any infinite subset is equal to 1, or equivalently, the set  is finite for any . The lattice (N, |) is locally finite. Note that in this lattice, the element generally denoted "0" is actually 1 and vice versa.

Morphisms of complete lattices 
The traditional morphisms between complete lattices are the complete homomorphisms (or complete lattice homomorphisms). These are characterized as functions that preserve all joins and all meets. Explicitly, this means that a function f: L→M between two complete lattices L and M is a complete homomorphism if

  and
 ,

for all subsets A of L. Such functions are automatically monotonic, but the condition of being a complete homomorphism is in fact much more specific. For this reason, it can be useful to consider weaker notions of morphisms, that are only required to preserve all joins (giving a category Sup) or all meets (giving a category Inf), which are indeed inequivalent conditions.  This notion may be considered as a homomorphism of complete meet-semilattices or complete join-semilattices, respectively.

Galois connections and adjoints 

Furthermore, morphisms that preserve all joins are equivalently characterized as the lower adjoint part of a unique Galois connection. For any pair of preorders P and Q, these are given by pairs of monotone functions f and g such that

where f is called the lower adjoint and g is called the upper adjoint. By the adjoint functor theorem, a monotone map between any pair of preorders preserves all joins if and only if it is a lower adjoint, and preserves all meets if and only if it is an upper adjoint.

As such, each join-preserving morphism determines a unique upper adjoint in the inverse direction that preserves all meets. Hence, considering complete lattices with complete semilattice morphisms boils down to considering Galois connections as morphisms. This also yields the insight that the introduced morphisms do basically describe just two different categories of complete lattices: one with complete homomorphisms and one with meet-preserving functions (upper adjoints), dual to the one with join-preserving mappings (lower adjoints).

A particularly important special case is for lattices of subsets P(X) and P(Y) and a function from X to Y. In this case, the direct image and inverse image maps between the power sets are upper and lower adjoints to each other, respectively.

Free construction and completion

Free "complete semilattices" 
As usual, the construction of free objects depends on the chosen class of morphisms. Let us first consider functions that preserve all joins (i.e. lower adjoints of Galois connections), since this case is simpler than the situation for complete homomorphisms. Using the aforementioned terminology, this could be called a free complete join-semilattice.

Using the standard definition from universal algebra, a free complete lattice over a generating set S is a complete lattice L together with a function i:S→L, such that any function f from S to the underlying set of some complete lattice M can be factored uniquely through a morphism f° from L to M. Stated differently, for every element s of S we find that f(s) = f°(i(s)) and that f° is the only morphism with this property. These conditions basically amount to saying that there is a functor from the category of sets and functions to the category of complete lattices and join-preserving functions which is left adjoint to the forgetful functor from complete lattices to their underlying sets.

Free complete lattices in this sense can be constructed very easily: the complete lattice generated by some set S is just the powerset 2S, i.e. the set of all subsets of S, ordered by subset inclusion. The required unit i:S→2S maps any element s of S to the singleton set {s}. Given a mapping f as above, the function f°:2S→M is defined by
 
.

Then f° transforms unions into suprema and thus preserves joins.

Our considerations also yield a free construction for morphisms that do preserve meets instead of joins (i.e. upper adjoints of Galois connections). In fact, we merely have to dualize what was said above: free objects are given as powersets ordered by reverse inclusion, such that set union provides the meet operation, and the function f° is defined in terms of meets instead of joins. The result of this construction could be called a free complete meet-semilattice. One should also note how these free constructions extend those that are used to obtain free semilattices, where we only need to consider finite sets.

Free complete lattices 
The situation for complete lattices with complete homomorphisms obviously is more intricate. In fact, free complete lattices do generally not exist. Of course, one can formulate a word problem similar to the one for the case of lattices, but the collection of all possible words (or "terms") in this case would be a proper class, because arbitrary meets and joins comprise operations for argument-sets of every cardinality.

This property in itself is not a problem: as the case of free complete semilattices above shows, it can well be that the solution of the word problem leaves only a set of equivalence classes. In other words, it is possible that proper classes of the class of all terms have the same meaning and are thus identified in the free construction. However, the equivalence classes for the word problem of complete lattices are "too small", such that the free complete lattice would still be a proper class, which is not allowed.

Now one might still hope that there are some useful cases where the set of generators is sufficiently small for a free complete lattice to exist. Unfortunately, the size limit is very low and we have the following theorem:

 The free complete lattice on three generators does not exist; it is a proper class.

A proof of this statement is given by Johnstone; the original argument is attributed to Alfred W. Hales; see also the article on free lattices.

Completion 

If a complete lattice is freely generated from a given poset used in place of the set of generators considered above, then one speaks of a completion of the poset. The definition of the result of this operation is similar to the above definition of free objects, where "sets" and "functions" are replaced by "posets" and "monotone mappings". Likewise, one can describe the completion process as a functor from the category of posets with monotone functions to some category of complete lattices with appropriate morphisms that is left adjoint to the forgetful functor in the converse direction.

As long as one considers meet- or join-preserving functions as morphisms, this can easily be achieved through the so-called Dedekind–MacNeille completion. For this process, elements of the poset are mapped to (Dedekind-) cuts, which can then be mapped to the underlying posets of arbitrary complete lattices in much the same way as done for sets and free complete (semi-) lattices above.

The aforementioned result that free complete lattices do not exist entails that an according free construction from a poset is not possible either. This is easily seen by considering posets with a discrete order, where every element only relates to itself. These are exactly the free posets on an underlying set. Would there be a free construction of complete lattices from posets, then both constructions could be composed, which contradicts the negative result above.

Representation 
Already G. Birkhoff's Lattice Theory book contains a very useful representation method. It associates a complete lattice to any binary relation between two sets by constructing a Galois connection from the relation, which then leads to two dually isomorphic closure systems. Closure systems are intersection-closed families of sets. When ordered by the subset relation ⊆, they are complete lattices.

A special instance of Birkhoff's construction starts from an arbitrary poset (P,≤) and constructs the Galois connection from the order relation ≤ between P and itself. The resulting complete lattice is the Dedekind-MacNeille completion. When this completion is applied to a poset that already is a complete lattice, then the result is isomorphic to the original one. Thus we immediately find that every complete lattice is represented by Birkhoff's method, up to isomorphism.

The construction is utilized in formal concept analysis, where one represents real-word data by binary relations (called formal contexts) and uses the associated complete lattices (called concept lattices) for data analysis. The mathematics behind formal concept analysis therefore is the theory of complete lattices.

Another representation is obtained as follows: A subset of a complete lattice is itself a complete lattice (when ordered with the induced order) if and only if it is the image of an increasing and idempotent (but not necessarily extensive) self-map. 
The identity mapping obviously has these two properties. Thus all complete lattices occur.

Further results 
Besides the previous representation results, there are some other statements that can be made about complete lattices, or that take a particularly simple form in this case. An example is the Knaster–Tarski theorem, which states that the set of fixed points of a monotone function on a complete lattice is again a complete lattice. This is easily seen to be a generalization of the above observation about the images of increasing and idempotent functions, since these are instances of the theorem.

See also 
 lattice (order).

References

Closure operators
Lattice theory